Miroslav Miller (born 19 August 1980) is a retired Czech goalkeeper lastly played for AC Sparta Prague.

References
 
 Guardian Football

1980 births
Living people
Czech footballers
Association football goalkeepers
Czech First League players
AC Sparta Prague players
People from Beroun
FK Mladá Boleslav players
Sportspeople from the Central Bohemian Region